Muller Pereira Roque (born 15 November 1990), simply known as Muller, is a Brazilian retired footballer who played as a central defender.

Muller's brothers Maicon and Maurides are also footballers. The former is also a defender, while the latter is as a forward.

References

External links

1990 births
Living people
Brazilian footballers
Association football defenders
Sport Club Internacional players
Esporte Clube Tigres do Brasil players
Olímpia Futebol Clube players
Clube Atlético Bragantino players
Campeonato de Portugal (league) players
SC Mirandela players
G.D. Tourizense players
Gondomar S.C. players
Veikkausliiga players
Kemi City F.C. players
Brazilian expatriate footballers
Brazilian expatriate sportspeople in Portugal
Brazilian expatriate sportspeople in Finland
Expatriate footballers in Portugal
Expatriate footballers in Finland
People from Barretos